Coppenaxfort  is a hamlet in the Nord department in northern France. It is located on the territory of three communes : Brouckerque, Craywick and Bourbourg.

Geography 

Coppenaxfort is located at the junction of Dérivation de la Colme and Canal de Bourbourg canals. The Vliet river flows there too.

History 

Around 1644, the Spanish army build a little fort in the place named Coppenax.

Economy 

The hamlet had a strong industrial activity between 18th and 20th centuries. Famous industries were Duriez distillery (1857-1986), Chevalier flour milling industry (1911-1980), Dambre brewery (1769-1952).

Cityscape 

The Craywick side has manors which belong to the Duriez family. Coppenaxfort as a big bridge, which was made in 2009 to replace the old one from 1935.

See also
Communes of the Nord department

Villages in Hauts-de-France